Adham Khalid Ali Abdelhameed (born 14 January 2002), is an Egyptian professional footballer who plays as a left back for UAE Pro League club Al Ain.

Early life
Adham Khalid is an Egyptian player born in the United Arab Emirates.

Club career

Early career

Al Jazira
In February 2020, Adham joined Al Jazira, and played for U19, U21.

Al Ain
In August 2021, Adham joined Al Ain. His official debut with the first team was against Al Wasl on 4 January 2022 in League Cup.

Career statistics

Club

References

External links

Adham Khalid profile at UAEFA
Adham Khalid stats at UAE Pro League
 

2002 births
Living people
Egyptian footballers
Association football defenders
La Liga academy HPC players
Al Ain FC players
Al Jazira Club players
UAE Pro League players
Egyptian expatriate sportspeople in the United Arab Emirates
Expatriate footballers in the United Arab Emirates